Catocala neglecta is a moth of the family Erebidae. It is found in Mongolia.

References

External links
 

neglecta
Moths described in 1888
Moths of Asia